Ascalon is an unincorporated community in Walker County, in the U.S. state of Georgia.

History
A post office called Ascalon was established in 1881, and remained in operation until it was discontinued in 1919. The community took its name after the ancient city of Ashkelon.

References

Unincorporated communities in Walker County, Georgia
Unincorporated communities in Georgia (U.S. state)